Happy Ground is the second album by American jazz vibraphonist Johnny Lytle which was recorded in 1961 for the Jazzland label. The album was later reissued on the Riverside label in 1963.

Track listing
All compositions by Johnny Lytle except as indicated
 "Lela"- 4:13
 "Secret Love" (Paul Francis Webster, Sammy Fain) - 6:51
 "When I Fall In Love" (Edward Heyman, Victor Young) - 4:24
 "Tag Along" (Clark, Ness) 3:12
 "It's All Right with Me" (Cole Porter) - 5:36
 "Happy Ground" - 7:13
 "My Funny Valentine" (Richard Rodgers, Lorenz Hart) - 4:12
 "Take the "A" Train" (Billy Strayhorn) - 2:50

Personnel 
Johnny Lytle - vibraphone  
Milton Harris - organ
William "Peppy" Hinnant - drums

References 

1961 albums
Johnny Lytle albums
Jazzland Records (1960) albums